Belören is a village in the Oğuzeli District, Gaziantep Province, Turkey. The village is inhabited by Turkicized Arabs of the Damalha tribe and Abdals of the Maya Sekenler tribe.

References

Villages in Oğuzeli District